Julius Bernhard Friedrich Adolph Wilbrand (22 August 1839 – 22 June 1906) was a German chemist. Born in Gießen to Franz Joseph Julius Wilbrand and Albertine Knapp, he discovered trinitrotoluene in 1863, but the compound's use as an explosive was not developed until later. Wilbrand obtained trinitrotoluene or TNT by the nitration of toluene.

References 

1839 births
1906 deaths
19th-century German chemists
People from Giessen
University of Giessen alumni